The real was the currency of Paraguay until 1856. Initially, the Spanish colonial real circulated. This was followed, in 1813, by the Argentine real. In 1845, Paraguay began issuing its own reales. Sixteen silver reales equaled one gold escudo. In 1856, the Paraguayan peso was introduced, worth 8 reales. The real continued to circulate as the subdivision of the peso until 1870, when Paraguay decimalized.

The only coin issued for Paraguay in this currency was a copper  real piece, struck in 1845. These coins were devalued to  real in 1847.

References

 

Modern obsolete currencies
1856 disestablishments
19th-century economic history
Currencies of Paraguay
History of Paraguay